Ship Cafe is a 1935 American musical film directed by Robert Florey.

Cast 
 Carl Brisson as Chris Anderson
 Arline Judge as Ruby
 Mady Christians as Countess Boranoff
 William Frawley as Briney O'Brien
 Eddie Davis as Eddie Davis
 Inez Courtney as Molly
 Grant Withers as Rocky Stone
 Hedda Hopper as Tutor
 Irving Bacon as Slim
 uncredited players include Jack Norton and Tiny Sandford

External links 
 

1935 films
Films directed by Robert Florey
Paramount Pictures films
1935 musical films
American black-and-white films
American musical films
1930s American films